Johann von Metzenhausen (1492–1540) was the Archbishop-Elector of Trier from 1531 to 1540.

Biography

Johann von Metzenhausen was born in Neef in 1492, the son of Heinrich von Metzenhausen and his wife Margarete Boos von Waldeck.  He became a domiciliar of the cathedral chapter of the Cathedral of Trier in 1505, and became a canon in 1511.  The cathedral chapter elected him precentor in 1512; dean in 1517; and provost in 1521.  In the wake of the death of Richard von Greiffenklau zu Vollrads, the cathedral chapter met on 27 March 1531 and elected Metzenhausen as the new Archbishop of Trier.

As archbishop, Metzenhausen opposed the Protestant movement, though he was generally conciliatory.  He instituted reforms at the University of Trier and worked to improve the training of the clergy in the Archbishopric of Trier.  With the outbreak of the Münster Rebellion in 1534, Metzenhausen helped raise troops to defeat the Anabaptist uprising.  He attended the Colloquy of Haguenau in 1540, serving as one of the presidents of the colloquy.

Metzenhausen died suddenly on 22 July 1540 while visiting Thanstein Castle, near Haguenau.

References

Sources
Peter G. Bietenholz and Thomas Brian Deutscherp, Contemporaries of Erasmus (University of Toronto Press, 1985), Vol. 2, p. 439

1492 births
1540 deaths
John 03